Brian O'Neill may refer to:

Brian O'Neill (1574) (died 1574), chief of the O'Neills of Clanaboy, surrendering his title to Sir Philip Sidney for a knighthood in 1567
Brian MacArt O'Neill (died 1607), member of the O'Neill dynasty executed for manslaughter 
Brian O'Neill (ice hockey, born 1929), Canadian executive in the National Hockey League
Brian O'Neill (ice hockey, born 1988), American ice hockey player 
Brian J. O'Neill (born 1949), American politician
Brian O'Neill (superintendent) (1941–2009), American superintendent of the Golden Gate National Recreation Area
Brian O'Neill (died 1260), High King of Ireland
Brian C. O'Neill (born 1965), American earth system scientist and demographer
Brian D. O'Neill (born 1949), American author and attorney
Brian O'Neill (American football) (born 1995), American football offensive tackle
Brian O'Neill, Baron Dungannon (died 1562), Irish aristocrat
Sir Brian O'Neill, 2nd Baronet (died 1694), Irish landowner, barrister and judge
Brian O'Neill (journalist) (c. 1900–1975), English and Irish journalist and author
Brian O'Neill, fictional Irish gangster in Mafia II

See also 
Brian O'Neil (disambiguation)